{{DISPLAYTITLE:Omicron2 Cancri}}

Omicron2 Cancri (ο2 Cnc, ο2 Cancri) is a solitary, yellow-white-hued star in the zodiac constellation of Cancer. With an apparent visual magnitude of +5.67, it can be viewed with the naked eye on a dark night. Based upon an annual parallax shift of 21.68 mas as seen from Earth, this star is located around 150 light-years from the Sun. It most likely forms a co-moving pair with Omicron1 Cancri.

With a stellar classification of F0 IV, this is an F-type subgiant star that has left the main sequence and is evolving toward the giant stage. It is estimated to be roughly 300 million years old with a relatively high rotation rate, as shown by a projected rotational velocity of around 90.5 km/s.

The star has an infrared excess, suggesting it surrounded by a circumstellar debris disk. Modelling of this structure indicates there are three distinct components, consisting of belts orbiting at distances of about 20 AU, 80 AU and 270 AU from the central star. They are inclined at an angle of 64° to the line of sight along a position angle of 103°. The gaps between the belts are most likely maintained by orbiting planets.

References

F-type subgiants
Circumstellar disks
Cancri, Omicron2
Cancer (constellation)
Durchmusterung objects
Cancri, 63
076582
044001
3565